Doxazosin, sold under the brand names Cardura among others, is a medication used to treat symptoms of benign prostatic hyperplasia (enlarged prostate) and hypertension (high blood pressure). For high blood pressure, it is a less preferred option. It is taken by mouth.

Common side effects include dizziness, sleepiness, swelling, nausea, shortness of breath, and abdominal pain. Severe side effects may include low blood pressure with standing, an irregular heart beat, and priapism. It is a α1-selective adrenergic blocker in the quinazoline class of compounds.

Doxazosin was patented in 1977 and came into medical use in 1988. It is available as a generic medication. In 2020, it was the 209th most commonly prescribed medication in the United States, with more than 2million prescriptions.

Medical uses

High blood pressure
Doxazosin is usually added to other antihypertensive therapy such as calcium channel antagonists, diuretics, beta-adrenoreceptor antagonists, angiotensin-converting enzyme inhibitors and angiotensin-2 receptor blockers.

Doxazosin is generally considered to be safe, well tolerated and effective as an add-on antihypertensive drug.

Like other alpha-1 receptor antagonists, it has a role in the peri-operative management of pheochromocytoma.

Benign prostatic hyperplasia
Doxazosin is considered to be effective in reducing urinary symptom scores and improving peak urinary flow in men with benign prostatic hypertrophy.

History
The Antihypertensive and Lipid Lowering Treatment to Prevent Heart Attack Trial (ALLHAT) study stopped its arm of the trial looking at alpha blockers, because doxazosin was less effective than a simple diuretic, and because patients on doxazosin had a 25% higher rate of cardiovascular disease and twice the rate of congestive heart failure as patients on diuretics. Pfizer, aware of the results before publication, launched a marketing campaign in early 2000, and sales were largely unaffected, despite the dangers highlighted by the study.

References

External links 
 

Alpha-1 blockers
Benzodioxans
Carboxamides
Guanidines
Phenol ethers
Piperazines
Quinazolines
Wikipedia medicine articles ready to translate